Chaqeh-ye Baluchha (also Romanized as Chāqeh-ye Balūchhā; also known as Chāgheh-ye Balūchhā and Chāqeh) is a village in Safaiyeh Rural District, in the Central District of Zaveh County, Razavi Khorasan Province, Iran. At the 2006 census, its population was 285, in 57 families.

References 

Populated places in Zaveh County